William Burke, Lord of Bealatury (fl. 1580s-1616) was an Irish noble and soldier who served in Spain, and later in Ireland during the Nine Years' War.

Career
Burke was a member of the Burke family of Clanricarde, in what is now County Galway. He was one of five brothers who left Ireland to enrol in Spanish service in the late 1580s. The five were sons of John na Seamar Burke (died 1583) and nephews of Ulick Burke, 3rd Earl of Clanricarde (died 1601). The eldest of the family was Redmond Burke, Baron Leitrim. They were in Ireland in time to participate in the Nine Years' War (Ireland). Philip O'Sullivan Beare relates that in 1599 William Burke secured a victory over "English recruits clad in red coats".

Both William and Redmond were "some of the chiefs who were along with Red Hugh O'Donnell at Kinsale in 1601". In the aftermath of the battle it was determined that O'Donnell, "Redmond, the son of John Burke, and Captain Hugh Mus, the son of Robert, should go to Spain to complain of their distresses and difficulties to the King of Spain." O'Neill and O'Donnell determined that "These chiefs left some of their neighbouring confederates in Munster, to plunder it in their absence, namely: Captain Tyrrell, the other sons of John Burke, and other gentlemen besides them."

William accompanied Donal Cam O'Sullivan Beare on his march north in 1603. He appears to have gone to Spain in the years afterwards.

William Burke signed himself Lord of Bealatury in Spanish documents of 1616.

See also
 House of Burke
 Burke (surname)
 Clanricarde
 Ulick na gCeann Burke, 1st Earl of Clanricarde

References

External links
 http://www.ucc.ie/celt/published/T100077/index.html
 http://www.ucc.ie/celt/online/T100005F/text013.html
 https://www.academia.edu/8243548/Glimpses_of_Irishmen_in_Spanish_armies_1621-1644

16th-century Irish people
17th-century Irish people
People from County Galway
Irish soldiers in the Spanish Army
Irish emigrants to Spain
Irish expatriates in Spain
William
People of Elizabethan Ireland